The 1968–69 Gonzaga Bulldogs men's basketball team represented Gonzaga University during the 1968–69 NCAA University Division basketball season. In the sixth season of the Big Sky Conference, the Bulldogs were led by eighteenth-year head coach Hank Anderson and played their home games on campus at Kennedy Pavilion in Spokane, Washington.

References

External links
Sports Reference – Gonzaga Bulldogs: 1968–69 basketball season

Gonzaga Bulldogs men's basketball seasons
Gonzaga